This article lists the major power stations located in Tianjin.

Non-renewable

Coal-based

Gas-based

Renewable

Wind

References 

Power stations
Tianjin